Josephine Gruhn (April 14, 1927 – April 4, 2015) was an American politician who served in the Iowa House of Representatives from the 12th district from 1983 to 1993.

She died on April 4, 2015, in Spirit Lake, Iowa at age 87.

References

1927 births
2015 deaths
Democratic Party members of the Iowa House of Representatives
People from Britt, Iowa